The Independent State of Croatia (1941–1945) was a European country located in Southern Europe, corresponding approximately to today's Croatia and Bosnia and Herzegovina. Listed below are its embassies and consulates:

Prague (General consulate)
 Bulgaria
Sofia (Embassy)

Helsinki (Embassy)
 Germany
Berlin (Embassy)
Vienna (General consulate)
Graz (Consulate)
Ljubljana (from 1943, Consulate)
 Hungary
Budapest (Embassy)
 Italy
Rome (Embassy)
Milan (General consulate)
Ljubljana (until 1943, Consulate)
Zadar (General consulate)
 Romania
Bucharest (Embassy)
 Government of National Salvation (Territory of the Military Commander in Serbia)
Belgrade (Consular representation)
 Slovakia
Bratislava (Embassy)
 Spain
Madrid (Embassy)

Zürich (Permanent commerce delegation)

See also
 Foreign relations of Croatia

Independent State of Croatia